The 2011-12 Breedon Aggregates Highland League Cup was the 67th edition of the Highlands' premier knock-out football competition.  The winners were Buckie Thistle, who defeated Cove Rangers 2-0 in the final at Princess Royal Park in Banff.

First round

In the first round draw, 14 clubs were given a bye into the Second Round, and four clubs were drawn to play each other in the First Round. Ties in the First Round took place on Saturday 3 March.

Second round

Ties in the Second Round took place on Saturday 17 March.

1 After Extra Time

Third round

Ties in the Third Round took place on Saturday 7 April.

1 After Extra Time 
2 After Extra Time - Keith won 4-3 on penalties

Semi-finals

Ties in the semi-finals took place on Saturday 21 April

Final

Highland League Cup seasons